Picar is a village and a former municipality in the Gjirokastër County, southern Albania. At the 2015 local government reform it became a subdivision of the municipality Gjirokastër. The population at the 2011 census was 937. The municipal unit consists of the villages Picar, Shtëpëz, Kolonjë, Golem and Kaparjel  which are all inhabited by Bektashi Albanians.

Notable people
Çelo Picari, one of the leaders of the Albanian Revolt of 1847.

References

Former municipalities in Gjirokastër County
Administrative units of Gjirokastër
Villages in Gjirokastër County